12 Tiny Christmas Tales (stylized onscreen as 12 tiny Christmas tales) is an American Christmas animated short film that was broadcast on Cartoon Network on December 7, 2001. This project was animated and directed by Bill Plympton and Inspired by Christmas cards that Plympton began drawing for his parents in 1964.

Plot
A grandmother tells her three grandchildren increasing bizarre stories of Christmas.

Segments
The stories are based on eight-panel sequences. 
Victor the Tree
When Victor was young, his mother told him if he was a good tree and grew straight, he will be chosen as the village square tree. So, little tree Victor grew big and straight which make him become the village square tree.
Cecil the Snowman
Cecil fell in love with a snow girl, but they were separated by snow fissure. That did not stop Cecil, he jumped all the way to the other side of the snow to be with his love and lived happily ever after. 
Blitzen
Blitzen, the reindeer, was telling jokes in the North Pole to his friends, meanwhile he was imagining himself in Las Vegas being famous telling his jokes.
The 12 Days of Christmas
A lady opening the door getting many different types of birds as gifts as the days passed. In the end she cooks all the bird and have dinner with the man. 
A Little Veggie Christmas
A small vegetable in the market was taken by old lady and taken home to put as decoration in a door. 
The Killer Snowflake
Old bob went for a walk in the night, he was missing the next morning. The next night widow Hadley went shopping and did not return a trap was set and the killer snowflake was trapped and taken to court his crystallized tears were turned into very beautiful snowflake. He fell in love and moved into a house into the woods.
Lester the Loud Tie
A tie was chosen by a girl in the store and gave it to his father as a Christmas present. Her dad returned the tie. But then her daughter went back to get the tie and used it as a wreath crown’s bow.
The Dancing Bear and the King
The kingdom was sad because the king was sad in the holiday season. He was not able to get the holiday spirit, costumes did not work. So the village got a dancing bear for the circus to make the king happy so he did. 
The Boy Who Loved Christmas
Eugene the boy who loved Christmas on all the seasons Easter, summer, and hallowing. He run around with his Santa Clause Christmas costume.  
The Peddler and the Donkey
A peddler was scared by a “crazy local dog” the horse pulling the carriage and the peddler got scared and run away.
The Plucky Present
An animated present fall off from Santa clause’s bag, the animated present tries to find his destination which is Jenny’s house. 
The Carolers
A man was trying to sing but a dog was interrupting him howling, so the man decided to come closer to the dog and joins the dog by singing.

Cast
Madelon Thomas as Grandma
Billy Schneider as Older Boy
Madeline Rogan	as Little Girl
Peter Dylan Rogan as Younger Boy
Oliver Wyman as Blitzen / Angry Guy (credited as Pete Zarustica)
Tony Carroll as Plucky Present / Lester the Tie / Announcer / Santa Claus / Dad
Rebecca Honig as Veggies
Sheldonna Smythe as Little Girl (Lester the Tie)

Additional voices
Bill Plympton
Maureen McElheron

Songs
In this film there are nine original songs, which were written and executive-produced by Maureen McElheron. Hank Bones instead served as a producer. Finally, "Kalinka" was the only famous song inserted into it.

 "Cecil the Snowman"
 "Remember Christmas"
 "Victor the Tree"
 "Blitzen's Theme"
 "Everyday's a Holiday"
 "Donkey and Peddler"
 "Plucky Present"
 "Killer Snowflake"
 "Veggie Christmas"
 "Kalinka" (traditional version)

Credits
 Animated & Directed by: Bill Plympton
 Camera: John Donnelly
 Editor: Anthony Arcidi
 Sound: Georgia Hilton
 Associate Producers: Maureen McElheron and John Holderried
 Music Producer: Hank Bones
 Art Supervisor: Signe Baumane
 Artists: Jesse Schmall, Andrea Breitman, Sasha Vetrov, Lori Samsel, Celia Bullwinkel, Rose Bevans
 Voices: Madelon Thomas, Billy Schneider, Madeline Rogan, Peter Dylan Rogan, Pete Zarustica, Tony Carroll, Rebecca Honig, Sheldonna Smythe, Bill Plympton, Maureen McElheron
 Plymptoons

See also
 List of Christmas films

Notes

External links
 

2001 television films
2001 films
2000s animated short films
2000s Christmas films
American Christmas films
American animated television films
Films directed by Bill Plympton
Christmas television films
2000s American films
Santa Claus in film